Chionodes pentadora is a moth in the family Gelechiidae. It is found in French Guiana.

The wingspan is 12–14 mm. The forewings are dark purple-fuscous with yellow markings. There is a slightly oblique oval transverse blotch from the costa at one-fourth reaching three-fourths across the wing. There is also a spot beneath the middle of the disc and an irregular inwardly oblique transverse blotch from the costa at two-thirds, reaching more than half across the wing. There is also a spot on the tornus and a small spot before the apex. The hindwings are dark grey.

References

Chionodes
Moths described in 1917
Moths of South America